Gomberg reaction may refer to:
Gomberg–Bachmann reaction, an aryl–aryl coupling reaction via a diazonium salt
Gomberg radical reaction, forming a triphenylmethyl radical by treating triphenylmethyl chloride with certain metals

See also
Moses Gomberg (1866–1947), scientist whom the reaction names honor